The True World Group is an American conglomerate. It is controlled by the Unification Church.

History 
The Group primarily operates the seafood related businesses of the Unification Church. This includes fishing vessel production, seafood catching, seafood processing, seafood distribution, and retail sale.

In 2017 True World Group was fined $50,000 for violating California laws against the trading of protected species.

In 2021 Aquamare Holdings (owned by the Huron Group) acquired surimi producer Shining Ocean from the True World Group.

Subsidiaries

True World Marine 
True World Marine operates a fleet of fishing vessels.

True World Foods 

True World Foods is an American food service company. It is the largest supplier to the American sushi industry.

Hospitality and retail 
The True World Group runs the Noble Fish and White Wolf Japanese Patisserie brands. Noble Fish began operating in 1984.

True World Restaurants  
True World Restaurants runs Japanese restaurants.

True World Market 
True World Market is a grocery chain.

Operations 
As of 2020 True World Group was headquartered in New Jersey.

Ownership 
As of 2006 the True World Group was owned by One Up Enterprises Inc. which was a subsidiary of Unification Church International Inc. At the time the Unification Church denied having a controlling interest in True World.

See also 
 Bolton Group

References 

Unification Church
Conglomerate companies